J. A. Green may refer to:

 Sandy Green (mathematician) (James Alexander Green, 1926–2014), professor of mathematics
 J. A. Green (photographer) (1873–1905), Nigerian photographer